The Padma Shri Award is India's fourth highest civilian honour. This article lists recipients for 2020–2022.

Numbers of recipients by year and by field

Numbers of recipients by year and by State/Union Territory/Other Nationality

Recipients in 2020

Recipients in 2021

Recipients in 2022

Recipients in 2023

See also

List of Padma Shri award recipients (2010–2019)
List of Padma Shri award recipients (2000–2009)
List of Padma Shri award recipients (1990–1999)
List of Padma Shri award recipients (1980–1989)
List of Padma Shri award recipients (1970–1979)
List of Padma Shri award recipients (1960–1969)
List of Padma Shri award recipients (1954–1959)

Explanatory notes

Non-citizen recipients

Posthumous recipients

References

External links
 
 

 
Lists of Indian award winners
2020s in India
2020s-related lists